Nobody's Child is a 1919 British silent film directed by George Edwardes Hall from his own play The Whirlpool. The film was made by British and Colonial Film and ran for 5 reels. The cast included Jose Collins as Francesco Samarjo, Godfrey Tearle as Ernest d'Alvard, Ben Webster as Joseph Samarjo, Christine Maitland as Countess Akhea, J. Fisher White as Baron Troejfer, Saba Raleigh as Baroness d'Alvard.

References

1919 films
British silent feature films
British black-and-white films